The World Transformed (or TWT) is a political festival which takes place in September, at the same time as the Labour Party conference. Beginning in 2016, organisers describe its purpose as "to create a space in which ideas can be freely exchanged and collectively developed".

Background

The festival was created with an aim of bringing together the activist and intellectual parts of the left together, and was inspired by the Dialectics of Liberation Congress held in 1967 which took place at the Roundhouse in London. It was originally organised by the left-wing campaigning organisation Momentum, though is independent and still receives support. Some of the festival's original organisers were Andrew Dolan, Joseph Todd and Sasha Josette. With the first festival in 2016, Todd said he wanted the presence of the festival to take over the city it was happening in, much like the Edinburgh Fringe Festival. Voices in the media, such as Guardian columnist Zoe Williams, had echoed its similarity to the Edinburgh fringe festival and labelled it "a festival of ideas". Through this festival, discussions around political education and municipal socialism – considered by the New Statesman George Eaton to have been previously dormant – were said to be revitalised.

The second festival in 2017 based in Brighton was successful, incorporating 9 different venues and had between 5,000 and 8,000 attendees. The organisers considered incorporating the Brighton Dome into the festival. In 2017 Labour leader Jeremy Corbyn endorsed the festival, describing it as "a powerful new space on the Labour Party conference fringe for people to debate policies, exchange ideas, and expand our political horizon with arts, music and culture." The attendees were largely young people who had previously taken little interest in party politics before the election of Corbyn as Labour leader in 2015 and were coming together to discuss how to build on Labour's advances in the 2017 general election. Its development has led to delegates from left-wing organisations and parties from across Europe and the USA.

Following the 2018 World Transformed event, many local events not directly organised by Momentum or TWT began to emerge. The events have been seen to foster political education, active participation, skills training, critical thinking and intellectual curiosity. Whilst some are one-day events, others such as the events in Bristol and Birmingham are multi-day festivals.

The 2020 festival took place online as a pay what you want festival due to the COVID-19 pandemic and the lockdown that ensued. It spread over the entire month of September rather than over four days. In 2021, the festival returned as a physical festival in Brighton with additional online access and— while using local venues and community centres— used its first purpose built festival space, which was built in Old Steine Gardens park.

List of events

List of locally organised World Transformed events

 Birmingham (Started in 2019)
 Bristol (Started in 2019)
 Cardiff (Started in 2022)
 Derby (Started in 2018)
 Nottingham
 Oxford (Started in 2019)
 Southampton (Started in 2019)
 Wandsworth (Started in 2019)
 Kernow (Started in 2022)

References

External links

Political events in the United Kingdom
Organisation of the Labour Party (UK)
Annual events in the United Kingdom
Recurring events established in 2016
2016 establishments in England
Progressive International